La Miel is a river in Colombia and a tributary of the Magdalena River. The river originates in the Cordillera Central of the Andes and its watershed is located within the Caldas Department. Tributaries of La Miel include the Tenerife, Salado, Manso, Moro, Pensilvania, Samana and Dulce rivers. The Miel I Dam is situated on the river.

References

Rivers of Colombia
Magdalena River